Polaris Media ASA is a media group which owns thirty newspapers in Norway. Based in Trondheim, the group was established in 2008. Major newspapers owned by the group include Adresseavisen, Harstad Tidende, Troms Folkeblad, Sunnmørsposten and Romsdals Budstikke. The company is listed on the Oslo Stock Exchange.

Business units

PNV Media 
Stampen Group (GP, TTELA, Hallandsposten, Hallands Nyheter, Bohusläningen, StrömstadsTidning, Alingsås Tidning, Kungsbacka-Posten, Kungälvs-Posten, Lokaltidningen STO, Mölndals-Posten and Free news pappers: Alingsås Kuriren, Lerums Tidning, ST-tidningen, Varbergsposten och Vänersborgaren)

Adresseavisen Gruppen
Adresseavisen
Avisa Sør-Trøndelag
Brønnøysunds Avis
Fosna-Folket
Hitra-Frøya
Innherreds Folkeblad og Verdalingen
Levanger-Avisa
Trønderbladet

Harstad Tidende Gruppen
Altaposten
Andøyposten
Framtid i Nord
Harstad Tidende
iTromsø
SortlandsAvisa
Troms Folkeblad
Vesteraalens Avis
Vesterålen Online

Polaris Media Nordvestlandet
Åndalsnes Avis
Driva
Fjordenes Tidende
Fjordingen
Herøynytt
Møre-Nytt
Romsdals Budstikke
Sunnmøringen
Sunnmørsposten
Vikebladet Vestposten

Polaris Trykk
Byavisa
Nr1 Adressa-trykk Orkanger
Polaris Trykk Alta
Polaris Trykk Harstad
Polaris Trykk Trondheim
Polaris Trykk Ålesund

References

 
Mass media companies of Norway
Mass media companies established in 2008
Companies based in Trondheim
Companies listed on the Oslo Stock Exchange
Norwegian companies established in 2008